is a city located in Miyagi Prefecture, Japan. , the city has an estimated population of 138,538, and a population density of 250 persons per km2 in 61,919 households.

Geography
Ishinomaki is in northeastern Miyagi Prefecture. The city borders on Ishinomaki Bay to the south and Minamisanriku city to the north, with the Kitakami Mountains to the west. Its coastline forms part of the Sanriku Fukkō National Park, which stretches north to Aomori Prefecture. Ishinomaki includes Tashirojima (also known as "Cat Island"), Ajishima, and Kinkasan, three islands off the south coast of Oshika Peninsula.

Neighboring municipalities
Miyagi Prefecture
Tome
Higashimatsushima
Wakuya
Misato
Onagawa
Minamisanriku

Climate
Ishinomaki has a humid climate (Köppen climate classification Cfa) characterized by mild summers and cold winters.

Demographics
Per Japanese census data, the population of Ishinomaki has declined over the past 40 years.

History

The area of present-day Ishinomaki was part of ancient Mutsu Province. During the Sengoku period, the area was contested by various samurai clans before the area came under the control of the Date clan of Sendai Domain during the Edo period. The town prospered as a major port and transshipment center for coastal shipping between Edo and northern Japan. The town of Ishinomaki was established within Oshika District on June 1, 1889 with the establishment of the modern municipalities system.

The city was founded on April 1, 1933. On April 1, 2005, Ishinomaki absorbed the neighboring towns of Kahoku, Kanan, Kitakami, Monou and Ogatsu, and the town of Oshika to more than quadruple its area and add nearly 60,000 people to its population.

The town of Ogatsu is regionally famous for its inkstones and has an annual scallop festival in the summer. Ayukawa, a town in Oshika, was formerly a base for several ships in Japan's whaling fleet.

2011 earthquake, tsunami, and subsidence

Ishinomaki was among the municipalities most seriously affected by the 2011 Tōhoku earthquake and tsunami. The tsunami destroyed around 80% of the 700 houses in the coastal port of Ayukawa, and the Kadonowaki neighborhood was largely leveled. Approximately 46% of the city was inundated by the tsunami. Following the tsunami, a Kamen Rider statue was found completely intact despite damage to the surrounding area; a writer for Tokyo Sports hoped that it would symbolically give hope to the survivors of the disaster.

Many public schools were completely destroyed, including , which lost 70 of 108 students and nine of 13 teachers and staff. There is still anger among some of the parents of the dead students because the teachers had wasted precious time in debating whether to evacuate to higher ground. And when the decision was finally made, the teachers had decided to get to higher ground further away from the school which necessitated crossing a nearby river bridge. It was here while crossing the bridge that both the teachers and students were swept away by the tsunami. This decision is deemed unreasonable by many of the parents because there is a hill right behind the school, which they could have reached quickly. One of the teachers had tried to persuade the other teachers to bring the students to safety uphill soon after the earthquake; when he was unsuccessful, he evacuated himself, managing to persuade one of the students to go with him - both survived. One of the teachers who survived the tsunami at the bridge later committed suicide.

, a total of 3,097 deaths had been confirmed in Ishinomaki due to the tsunami, with 2,770 unaccounted for. Approximately 29,000 city residents lost their homes.

Ishinomaki employs several foreigners to teach English in all of its elementary and junior high schools, as well as the two municipal high schools. American teacher Taylor Anderson was killed by the tsunami. Since her death, her family has been active in supporting the Ishinomaki school district, and has set up programs to further English education.

A once sandy beach in the Kadonowaki area completely disappeared and tides now reach the wall that once separated the beach from the road. Near the Mangakan Island, a walkway with benches was partially submerged in the river.

Rebuilding 
Since 2011, Ishinomaki and other municipalities have been focusing on rebuilding and attracting residents back into the area. In 2019, eight years after the tragedy, Okawa Elementary School remains in ruins, as a memorial to those that were lost in the tsunami. Numerous parents who lost children due to staff errors sued the school and won in 2019.

Ishinomaki and other neighboring cities started construction on levees and large walls along the coast to protect against future tsunamis.

Government
Ishinomaki has a mayor-council form of government with a directly elected mayor and a unicameral city legislature of 30 members. Ishinmaki, together with the town of Onagawa, contributes five seats to the Miyagi Prefectural legislature. In terms of national politics, the city is part of Miyagi 5th district of the lower house of the Diet of Japan.

Economy
Ishinomaki traditionally has been a center for commercial fishing, especially for the cultivation of oysters.

Education
Ishinomaki Senshu University
Ishinomaki has 36 public elementary schools, 20 public junior high schools and one public high school operated by the city government, and seven public high schools operated by the Miyagi Prefectural Board of Education. The prefectural also operates one special education school for the handicapped. A private university, the Ishinomaki Senshu University, is also located in the city.

Transportation

Railway

JR East

 Ishinomaki Line 
  -  -  -  -  -  -  -  -  
 Senseki Line(Senseki-Tohoku Line)
  -  -  - 
 Kesennuma Line 
  -

Intercity bus
Daily scheduled intercity buses bound for the following cities, through the Sanriku Expressway, are being served from Ishinomaki Station. 
 Sendai via Aeon Ishinomaki Shopping Center (Mall), by Miyakou Bus Co. Ltd., a subsidiary of Miyagi Transportation (Miyagi Kotsu) Co., Ltd.
 Shinjuku, Tokyo via Shibuya (overnight): via Sendai, operated by Miyagi Transportation (Miyagi Kotsu) Co., Ltd. and Keio Dentetsu Bus Corporation

Highways
 (Ishinomaki-kanan, Kahoku, Monou-toyosato and Monou-tsuyama interchanges)

Seaport
Port of Ishinomaki

Local attractions
 , replica of a ship commissioned in 1613 by Date Masamune to transport an embassy to the Pope in Rome.  
 Ishinomori Manga Museum along with Manga Road celebrating Shotaro Ishinomori's manga legacy.
 Ishinomaki Saint John the Apostle Orthodox Church
 Ishii lock
Numazu Shell Midden, a Jōmon period National Historic Site
 Saitō Garden
 The reed fields at the mouth of the Kitakami River at Ishinomaki is listed as one of the 100 Soundscapes of Japan by the Ministry of the Environment

Twin towns – sister cities

Ishinomaki is twinned with:
 Hitachinaka, Japan

Friendship cities

 Civitavecchia, Italy
 Hagi, Japan
 Kahoku, Japan
 Wenzhou, China

Noted people from Ishinomaki 
Jun Azumi, politician
Kasugafuji Akihiro, sumo wrestler
Tatsuji Fuse, lawyer, social activist
Sukekiyo Kameyama, voice actor
Isamu Kosugi, actor, movie director
Naoya Shiga, author
Mayo Suzukaze, actress
Keiko Suzuka, actress

References

External links

Official Website 

 
Cities in Miyagi Prefecture
Port settlements in Japan
Populated coastal places in Japan